Talíria Petrone Soares (born 9 April 1985) is a Brazilian politician. She has spent her political career representing Rio de Janeiro, having served as federal deputy representative since 2019.

Personal life
Petrone is the daughter of a musician and a teacher. She graduated with a degree in history from the Rio de Janeiro State University and with a master's degree in social work from Fluminense Federal University. Prior to entering politics, she worked as a public school teacher.

She identifies as an Afro-Brazilian, socialist, feminist, and supportive of LGBT rights. She was a close friend and inspired by late politician and activist Marielle Franco.

Political career
Petrone was the most voted candidate in the 2016 election for the council of Niterói, receiving 5,121 votes. In the 2018 election Petrone was the eighth most voted candidate in the state of Rio de Janeiro, with 107,317, being elected to the federal chamber of deputies. Petrone said that she received threats from opposition supporters. In June 2019 Brazilian civil police made arrest in a plot to assassinate Petrone, which was being hatched and planned from a dark web platform starting in 2018.

In March 2022 Petrone was amongst 151 international feminists signing Feminist Resistance Against War: A Manifesto, in solidarity with the Feminist Anti-War Resistance initiated by Russian feminists after the Russian invasion of Ukraine.

References

1985 births
Living people
People from Niterói
Brazilian feminists
Rio de Janeiro State University alumni
Fluminense Federal University alumni
Socialism and Liberty Party politicians
Members of the Chamber of Deputies (Brazil) from Rio de Janeiro (state)
Members of the Legislative Assembly of Rio de Janeiro
Brazilian LGBT rights activists
Brazilian politicians of African descent
Afro-Brazilian feminists
Brazilian women in politics